Chia-Hao Tang (born August 24, 1988), professionally known as Chase Tang, is a Taiwanese-Canadian actor. After completing a degree in commerce from the University of Guelph, Tang gave up a corporate career and instead sought out training as an actor. Tang made his professional debut on television in 2017.
Tang has participated in mental health awareness and climate change campaigns, including the UN Environment Programme's "World Is In Our Hands" campaign.

Early life and education 
Tang was born in Taipei, Taiwan. He has two elder brothers. In 1992, Tang's family immigrated to Bedford, Nova Scotia, Canada. He grew up in Bedford and Upper Tantallon playing hockey, including time spent as a Nova Scotia AAA hockey player. Tang attended Sir John A. Macdonald High School. He received a Bachelor of Commerce degree from the University of Guelph in 2016, majoring in marketing management.

After struggling to gain momentum in his corporate career, Tang decided to change direction and become an actor. He completed his first acting class in 2016, continuing to take regular classes and coaching, and in 2017 he made his first film appearances.  In August 2018 Tang joined ACTRA.

Career 
Tang's debut in professional acting started with a POM Wonderful commercial, followed by an uncredited role in Designated Survivor. Since then, he has worked in several short films and TV series. His movie View was viewed at the 2018 Cannes Film Festival In 2019, Tang filmed a scene for the pilot episode of Run. In his first major role, Tang was cast as supervillain Baryon in the Netflix series Jupiter's Legacy. He is an ambassador for TITIKA Active Couture. Tang is also the global spokesperson for Taiwanese refreshment brand Presotea.

Activism 
Tang has used his celebrity status to raise mental health awareness, and has taken on speaking engagements.

He was featured in the UN Environment Programme's (UNEP) "World Is In Our Hands" campaign, a UN's Act Now initiative for climate change awareness.

Filmography

References

External links 
Chase Tang on IMDb

1988 births
Living people
Male actors from Taipei
Taiwanese emigrants to Canada
People from Bedford, Nova Scotia
Male actors from Halifax, Nova Scotia
Canadian male television actors
Canadian male film actors
Canadian male actors of Chinese descent
Canadian male actors of Taiwanese descent
Canadian male actors of Asian descent
21st-century Canadian male actors
21st-century Taiwanese male actors